Westover Hills is an unincorporated community in New Castle County, Delaware, United States. Westover Hills is located west of North Dupont Road between Delaware Route 48 and Delaware Route 52 west of Wilmington.

References 

Unincorporated communities in New Castle County, Delaware
Unincorporated communities in Delaware